Should Husbands Work? is a 1939 American comedy film directed by Gus Meins and written by Taylor Caven and Jack Townley. The film stars James Gleason, Lucile Gleason, Russell Gleason, Harry Davenport, Berton Churchill and Marie Wilson. The film was released on July 26, 1939, by Republic Pictures.

Plot
Joe Higgins' wife Lil gets hired into a job that was meant for Joe, so now he has to stay home and do housework while she goes to work.

Cast
James Gleason as Joe Higgins
Lucile Gleason as Lil Higgins
Russell Gleason as Sidney Higgins
Harry Davenport as Grandpa Higgins
Berton Churchill as Barnes
Marie Wilson as Myrtle
Lynne Roberts as Jean Higgins 
Tommy Ryan as Tommy Higgins
Henry Kolker as Taylor
Arthur Hoyt as Roberts
Barry Norton as Ronald McDonald
Mary Forbes as Mrs. Barnes
William Brisbane as Williams
Harry C. Bradley as Snodgrass

References

External links
 

1939 films
American comedy films
1939 comedy films
Republic Pictures films
Films directed by Gus Meins
American black-and-white films
Films with screenplays by Jack Townley
Films produced by Sol C. Siegel
1930s English-language films
1930s American films